XEHL-AM is a radio station on 1010 AM in Guadalajara, Jalisco, known as Radio Cañón.

History
XEHL received its concession on June 17, 1941, and signed on the next year. It was owned by Radio Anunciadora Kist, S. de R.L. and operated on 1370 kHz, later moving to 1010. XEHL was affiliated to Radio Programas de México until 1949, when owner Alejandro Díaz Guerra broke ties with RPM.

It remained part of the Díaz family through various owners until Francisco Javier Díaz Romo sold all of his Guadalajara stations to Televisa Radio in 1992. In the early 2000s, XEHL was known as Radiante.

XEHL operated with 10,000 watts day/5,000 watts night from the time it moved to 1010 until the 1980s, when it increased daytime power to 50,000 watts.

In 2018, Televisa sold XEHL-AM to TV Zac, S.A. de C.V. However, NTR Medios de Comunicación did not begin programming XEHL on its own until September 16, 2019, when W Deportes left the air in Guadalajara to make way for Radio Cañón, a simulcast of XEHL and fellow NTR acquisition XEBA-AM with music in English and six hours of daily news programs on weekdays.

References

Radio stations in Guadalajara